The surname Rojo may refer to:

 Alba Rojo Cama (1961–2016), Mexican sculptor, daughter of Vicente
 Antonio Molino Rojo (1926–2011), Spanish actor
 Helena Rojo (born 1944), Mexican actress
 José Ángel Rojo (born 1948), Spanish footballer
 José Francisco 'Txetxu' Rojo (born 1947), Spanish footballer and coach
 Juan Carlos Rojo (born 1959), Spanish footballer
  Karen Rojo (Karen Paulina Rojo Venegas), alcaldesa of Antofagasta
 Marcos Rojo (born 1990), Argentine footballer 
 María Rojo (born 1943), Mexican actress and politician
 Sara Rojo Pérez, Spanish painter
 Tamara Rojo (born 1974), Spanish ballerina
 Vicente Rojo Almazán (1932–2021), Spanish-Mexican artist, father of Alba
 Vicente Rojo Lluch (1894–1966), prominent Republican army officer during the Spanish Civil War

Spanish-language surnames
Surnames from nicknames